Hatice Sultan or Hadice Sultan may refer to:
Hatice Sultan (daughter of Bayezid II), Ottoman princess
Hatice Sultan (daughter of Selim I), Ottoman princess
Hatice Sultan (daughter of Mehmed III), Ottoman princess
Hatice Sultan (daughter of Mehmed IV), Ottoman princess
Hatice Sultan (daughter of Ahmed III), Ottoman princess
Hatice Sultan (daughter of Mustafa III), Ottoman princess
Hatice Sultan (daughter of Murad V), Ottoman princess